is a former Japanese football player.

Playing career
Ono was born in Fukushima Prefecture on April 30, 1978. After graduating from University of Tsukuba, he joined J2 League club Mito HollyHock in 2001. He played many matches as forward from first season. In 2002, he scored 14 goals which is top scorer in the club. However his opportunity to play decreased from summer 2003. In 2004, he moved to his local club FC Primeiro in Regional Leagues. He retired end of 2010 season.

Club statistics

References

External links

1978 births
Living people
University of Tsukuba alumni
Association football people from Fukushima Prefecture
Japanese footballers
J2 League players
Mito HollyHock players
Association football forwards